Epidichostates strandi is a species of longhorn beetle in the subfamily Lamiinae. It was described by Breuning in 1935. It is known from Benin, the Ivory Coast, Gabon, Ghana, Cameroon, Guinea, the Democratic Republic of the Congo, and Sierra Leone.

Subspecies
 Epidichostates strandi jadoti Téocchi, 2001
 Epidichostates strandi strandi (Breuning, 1935)

References

Crossotini
Beetles described in 1935